23S rRNA pseudouridine2605 synthase (RluB, YciL) is an enzyme with systematic name 23S rRNA-uridine2605 uracil mutase. This enzyme catalyses the following chemical reaction

 23S rRNA uridine2605  23S rRNA pseudouridine2605

Pseudouridine synthase RluB converts uridine2605 of 23S rRNA to pseudouridine.

References

External links 
 

EC 5.4.99